Southville may refer to one of several locations:
 Southville, Bristol, England
 Southville City, a township in Bangi, Selangor, Malaysia
 Southville, Kentucky, United States
 Southville, Massachusetts, a village within the town of Southborough, United States
 Southville, Nova Scotia, Canada